Villanova Monteleone is a comune (municipality) in the Province of Sassari in the Italian region Sardinia, located about  northwest of Cagliari and about  southwest of Sassari.

Villanova Monteleone borders the following municipalities: Alghero, Bosa, Ittiri, Monteleone Rocca Doria, Montresta, Padria, Putifigari, Romana, Thiesi.

Demographic evolution

References

Cities and towns in Sardinia